The chief justice is the presiding member of a supreme court in many countries with a justice system based on English common law, such as the High Court of Australia, the Supreme Court of Canada, the Supreme Court of Ghana, the Court of Final Appeal of Hong Kong, the Supreme Court of India, the Supreme Court of Ireland, the Supreme Court of Japan, the Supreme Court of Nepal, the Supreme Court of New Zealand, the Supreme Court of Nigeria, the Supreme Court of Pakistan, the Supreme Court of the Philippines, the Supreme Court of Singapore, the Supreme Court of the United States, and provincial or state supreme courts/high courts.

The situation is slightly different in the three legal jurisdictions within the United Kingdom.  The courts of England and Wales are headed by the Lord Chief Justice of England and Wales; in Northern Ireland's courts, the equivalent position is the Lord Chief Justice of Northern Ireland, and in the courts of Scotland the head of the judiciary of Scotland is the Lord President of the Court of Session, who is also Lord Justice General of Scotland. These three judges are not, though, part of the Supreme Court of the United Kingdom, which operates across all three jurisdictions and is headed by the President of the Supreme Court of the United Kingdom.
 
The chief justice can be selected in many ways, but, in many nations, the position is given to the most senior justice of the court, while, in the United States, it is often the President's most important political nomination, subject to approval by the United States Senate. Although the title of this top American jurist is, by statute, Chief Justice of the United States, the term "Chief Justice of the Supreme Court" is often used unofficially.

In some courts, the chief justice has a different title, e.g. President of the supreme court. In other courts, the title of chief justice is used, but the court has a different name, e.g. the Supreme Court of Judicature in colonial (British) Ceylon, the Constitutional Court of South Africa, and the Supreme Court of Appeals of West Virginia (in the US state of West Virginia).

Competence
The Chief Justice's personal ruling is equal in weight to the rulings of any associate judges on the court.

In several countries, the chief justice is second in line to the office of president or governor general (or third in line, if there is a vice president or lieutenant governor general), should the incumbent die or resign. For example, if the Governor General of Canada is unable to perform the duties of the office, the Chief Justice of Canada performs the duties of the governor general. In India, in the event the President and the Vice- President are unable to discharge the functions due to death, resignation or removal, the Chief Justice of India acts as Officiating President of India.

Apart from their intrinsic role in litigation, they may have additional responsibilities, such as swearing in high officers of state; for instance, the Chief Justice of the United States traditionally administers the oath of office at the inauguration ceremony of the President of the United States, as does the Chief Justice of South Africa at the inauguration of the President of South Africa. In some countries, such as the United States, the Chief Justice is also responsible for presiding over certain legislative matters, such as during the impeachment trial of a president.

List of chief justice positions 

 Bailiff of Guernsey
 Bailiff of Jersey
 Chief Justice of Albania
 Chief Justice of Antigua
 Chief Justice of Australia
 Chief Justice of New South Wales
 Chief Justice of Queensland
 Chief Justice of South Australia
 Chief Justice of Tasmania
 Chief Justice of Victoria
 Chief Justice of Western Australia
 Chief Justice of the Bahamas
 Chief Justice of Bangladesh
 Chief Justice of Barbados
 Chief Justice of Belize
 Chief Justice of Bermuda
 Chief Justice of Borneo
 Chief Justice of Brazil
 Chief Justice of Canada
 Chief Justice of Alberta
 Chief Justice of British Columbia
 Chief Justice of Prince Edward Island
 Chief Justice of Manitoba
 Chief Justice of New Brunswick
 Chief Justice of Newfoundland and Labrador
 Chief Justice of Nova Scotia
 Chief Justice of Ontario
 Chief Justice of Quebec
 Chief Justice of Saskatchewan
 
 Chief Justice of Cyprus
 Chief Justice of the Supreme Court of Estonia
 Chief Justice of Fiji
 Chief Justice of Ghana
 Chief Justice of Gibraltar
 Chief Justice of Grenada
 Chief Justice of Guyana
 Chief Justice of Hong Kong
 Chief Justice of Hungary
 Chief Justice of India
 Chief Justice of the Bombay High Court
 Chief Justice of Gujarat
 Chief Justice of Himachal Pradesh
 Chief Justice of the Patna High Court
 Chief Justice of Uttarakhand
 Chief Justice of the Supreme Court of Indonesia
 Chief Justice of the Constitutional Court of Indonesia
 Chief Justice of Ireland
 Chief Justice of Jamaica
 Chief Justice of Japan
 Chief Justice of Kenya
 Chief Justice of Kiribati
 Chief Justice of the Supreme Court of Korea
 President of the Constitutional Court of Korea
 Chief Justice of the Leeward Islands
 Chief Justice of Liberia
 Chief Justice of Malta
 Chief Justice of Malaysia
 Chief Justice of the Federated States of Micronesia
 Chief Justice of Namibia
 Chief Justice of Nauru
 Chief Justice of Nepal
 Chief Justice of New Zealand
 Chief Justice of Nigeria
 Chief Justice of the Supreme Court of Norway
 Chief Justice of Pakistan
 Chief Justices of the Federal Shariat Court
 Chief Justice of the Islamabad High Court
 Chief Justice of the Philippines
 Chief Justice of Singapore
 Chief Justice of Sri Lanka
 Chief Justice of South Africa
 Chief Justice of St Lucia
 Chief Justice of St Vincent
 Chief Justice of Sudan
 Chief Justice of Tanzania
 Chief Justice of Zanzibar
 Chief Justice of Tonga
 Chief Justice of Trinidad and Tobago
 President of the Supreme Court of the United Kingdom
 Lord Chief Justice of England and Wales
 Lord President of the Court of Session and Lord Justice General of Scotland
 Lord Chief Justice of Northern Ireland
 Chief Justice of the United States

See also
Associate justice
Puisne judge
Chief Justice of the Common Pleas
Lord President of the Supreme Court
Chief judge (United States)

References

Judges
 
Legal professions
Court administration